Rumen Popov (Bulgarian: Румен Попов; born 21 May 1983, in Plovdiv) is a Bulgarian football player.

References

External links
Profile at Guardian's Stats Centre

1983 births
Living people
Bulgarian footballers
Association football midfielders
Botev Plovdiv players
First Professional Football League (Bulgaria) players